Crihana is a commune in Orhei District, Moldova. It is composed of three villages: Crihana, Cucuruzenii de Sus and Sirota.

References

Communes of Orhei District